Microregion is a designation for territorial entities.

Austria
Microregion (Tyrol)

Brazil
 Microregion (Brazil)

Klaus Roth and Ulf Brunnbauer
A microregion is a geographic region of a size between that of a community and that of a district.

See also
 Macroregion
 Mesoregion
 Microdistrict, Soviet and Central European urban housing schemes

References

Types of administrative division
Regions
Microregions